Arizona Raiders is a 1965 American Techniscope Western film directed by William Witney and starring Audie Murphy.

Plot
Clint Stewart (Audie Murphy) is a Confederate war hero who has gone out West to join a renegade band, Quantrill's Raiders, and ends up captured by the law.

Sent to prison with his friend Willie Martin (Ben Cooper), for riding with Quantrill (Fred Graham), the two go along with a jailbreak plan masterminded by former U.S. Army Captain Andrews (Buster Crabbe), who now heads the Arizona Rangers, to grant the men a full pardon if they help the Rangers stop a band of raiders who once rode with Quantrill. Clint has an old score to settle with Montana Smith (George Keymas), one of the Raiders, but plans to take off on his own until both his younger brother and his pal Willie are killed by the raiders.

Cast
 Audie Murphy as Clint
 Michael Dante as Brady
 Ben Cooper as Willie Martin
 Buster Crabbe as Captain Andrews of the Arizona Rangers
 Gloria Talbott as Martina
 Ray Stricklyn as Danny 'nobhead' Bonner
 George Keymas as Montana
 Fred Krone as Matt Edwards
 Willard Willingham as Eddie
 Red Morgan as Tex
 Fred Graham as Quantrell/Quantrill

Production
Murphy's salary for the film was $45,000.

See also
 List of American films of 1965

References

External links
 Arizona Raiders at IMDb
 Arizona Raiders at TCMDB
 
 
 Arizona Raiders at Apacheland Movie Ranch

1965 Western (genre) films
1965 films
American Western (genre) films
Audie Murphy
American Civil War films
Columbia Pictures films
Films directed by William Witney
Films scored by Richard LaSalle
1960s English-language films
Revisionist Western (genre) films
1960s American films
Films with screenplays by Richard Schayer